Rufus Putnam Ranney (October 30, 1813 – December 6, 1891) was a Democratic politician in the U.S. State of Ohio who helped write the second Ohio Constitution, and was a judge on the Ohio Supreme Court in 1851–1856 and 1863–1865.

Early life
Rufus Putnam Ranney was born at Blandford, Hampden County, Massachusetts. The family moved to Portage County, Ohio in 1824. He earned enough money chopping firewood to enter Western Reserve College then at Hudson, but not enough to complete the college course. At age 21 or 22 he began the study of law at the office of Joshua Reed Giddings and Benjamin Wade, and was admitted to the bar in 1836.

Legal

The firm of Wade and Ranney was formed because Giddings was elected to Congress. In 1845, Wade became judge of the Common Pleas before entering the Senate in 1851. In 1846, Ranney moved to Warren, Trumbull County. The Democrats nominated him for Congress in 1846 and 1848, in a district "hopelessly in the minority".

Political

In 1850, in heavily Whig Trumbull and Geauga counties, Ranney was elected to the second State Constitutional Convention. He served on the committees on the judiciary, on revision, and on amendments. Also on the judiciary committee were Henry Stanbery, Joseph Rockwell Swan, William S. Groesbeck, and William Kennon, Sr.

In 1892, a committee of the Ohio Bar, including Allen G. Thurman, Jacob Dolson Cox, F.E. Hutchins, and Samuel E. Williamson had this to say of Ranney's work at the convention:

Judicial

In March, 1851, under the old constitution, the General Assembly elected Ranney to the Supreme Court to succeed Judge Avery. Later that year, he was elected by the public, under the new Constitution, to a five-year term on the Supreme Court. In 1856, Josiah Scott defeated Ranney and a third party candidate for the seat. Ranney resigned shortly after the election, and Scott was seated late in 1856. Ranney began law practice at Cleveland in the firm Ranney, Backus, and Noble. In 1857 he was United States Attorney for the Northern District of Ohio.

In 1859, Ranney was nominated the Democratic candidate for governor, but lost to Republican William Dennison. In 1862, the Democrats nominated Ranney for Supreme Court again, and the Republicans nominated his law partner Franklin T. Backus. Ranney won, was seated February 1863, and resigned February 23, 1865 to return to private practice in Cleveland.

In 1874, he was appointed an Ohio Commissioner of the Centennial Exposition in Philadelphia

The Ohio State Bar Association was organized in 1881. Ranney was selected the first president of the association. Ranney died at home in Cleveland December 6, 1891. He was buried at Lake View Cemetery.

Ranney was married to Adeline W. Warner, and had four sons and two daughters.

Notes

References

Further reading

External links

Ohio lawyers
Justices of the Ohio Supreme Court
Ohio Democrats
Politicians from Cleveland
Case Western Reserve University alumni
1813 births
1891 deaths
Ohio Constitutional Convention (1850)
Burials at Lake View Cemetery, Cleveland
United States Attorneys for the Northern District of Ohio
People from Blandford, Massachusetts
19th-century American judges
19th-century American lawyers